Myrmecology (from Greek: μύρμηξ, myrmex, "ant" and λόγος, logos, "study") is a branch of entomology focusing on the scientific study of ants. Some early myrmecologists considered ant society as the ideal form of society and sought to find solutions to human problems by studying them. Ants continue to be a model of choice for the study of questions on the evolution of social systems because of their complex and varied forms of eusociality (social organization). Their diversity and prominence in ecosystems also has made them important components in the study of biodiversity and conservation. Recently, ant colonies are also studied and modeled for their relevance in machine learning, complex interactive networks, stochasticity of encounter and interaction networks, parallel computing, and other computing fields.

History
The word myrmecology was coined by William Morton Wheeler (1865–1937), although human interest in the life of ants goes back further, with numerous ancient folk references. The earliest scientific thinking based on observation of ant life was that of Auguste Forel (1848–1931), a Swiss psychologist who initially was interested in ideas of instinct, learning, and society. In 1874 he wrote a book on the ants of Switzerland, Les fourmis de la Suisse, and he named his home La Fourmilière (the ant colony). Forel's early studies included attempts to mix species of ants in a colony. He noted polydomy and monodomy in ants and compared them with the structure of nations.

Wheeler looked at ants in a new light, in terms of their social organization, and in 1910 he delivered a lecture at Woods Hole on "The Ant-Colony as an Organism", which pioneered the idea of superorganisms. Wheeler considered trophallaxis or the sharing of food within the colony as the core of ant society. This was studied using a dye in the food and observing how it spread in the colony.

Some, such as Horace Donisthorpe, worked on the systematics of ants. This tradition continued in many parts of the world until advances in other aspects of biology were made. The advent of genetics, ideas in ethology and its evolution led to new thought. This line of enquiry was pioneered by E. O. Wilson, who founded the field termed as sociobiology.

Interdisciplinary application

Ants often are studied by engineers for biomimicry and by network engineers for more efficient networking. It is not known clearly how ants manage to avoid congestions and how they optimize their movements to move in most efficient ways without a central authority that would send out orders. There already have been many applications in structure design and networking that have been developed from studying ants, but the efficiency of human-created systems is still not close to the efficiency of ant colonies. Furthermore, there are efforts to use ant algorithms and the behavioral strategies of ants in modern management.

Myrmecologists in fiction 
The black and white 1954 Warner Bros. movie Them! describes the visiting expert Dr. Harold Medford (played by Edmund Gwenn) from the Department of Agriculture in Washington DC as a myrmecologist.

Dr. Hank Pym is a fictional character appearing in American comic books published by Marvel Comics and the Marvel Cinematic Universe.

List of notable myrmecologists 
Note: Names are listed alphabetically.
 Ernest André (1838–1911), French entomologist
 Thomas Borgmeier (1892–1975), German-Brazilian theologian and entomologist
 Murray S. Blum (1929–2015), American chemical ecologist, an expert on pheromones
 William L. Brown Jr. (1922–1997), American entomologist
 Giovanni Cobelli (1849–1937), Italian entomologist, director of the Rovereto museum
 Arthur Charles Cole Jr. (1908–1955), American entomologist
 Walter Cecil Crawley, British entomologist
 William Steel Creighton (1902–1973), American entomologist
 Horace Donisthorpe (1870–1951), British myrmecologist, named several new species
 Carlo Emery (1848–1925), Italian entomologist
 Johan Christian Fabricius (1745–1808), Danish entomologist, student of Linnaeus
 Auguste-Henri Forel (1848–1931), Swiss myrmecologist, studied brain structure of humans and ants
 Émil August Goeldi (1859–1917), Swiss-Brazilian naturalist and zoologist
 William Gould (1715–1799), described by Horace Donisthorpe as "the father of British myrmecology"
 Robert Edmond Gregg (1912–1991), American entomologist
 Thomas Caverhill Jerdon (1811–1872), British physician, zoologist and botanist
 Walter Wolfgang Kempf (1920–1976), Brazilian myrmecologist
 Heinrich Kutter (1896–1990), Swiss myrmecologist 
 Nicolas Kusnezov also as Nikolaj Nikolajevich Kuznetsov-Ugamsky (1898–1963)
 Pierre André Latreille (1762–1833) French entomologist
 Sir John Lubbock (the 1st Lord and Baron Avebury) (1834–1913), wrote on hymenoptera sense organs
 William T. Mann (1886–1960), American entomologist
 Gustav Mayr (1830–1908), Austrian entomologist and professor in Pest and Vienna, specialised in Hymenoptera
 Carlo Menozzi also as Carlo Minozzi (1892–1943), Italian entomologist
 William Nylander (1822–1899), Finnish botanist, biologist, mycologist, entomologist and myrmecologist
 Basil Derek Wragge-Morley (1920–1969), research included genetics, social behaviour of animals, and the behaviour of agricultural pests
 Fergus O'Rourke (1923– 2010), Irish zoologist
 Julius Roger (1819–1865), German physician, entomologist and folklorist
 Felix Santschi (1872–1940), Swiss entomologist 
 Theodore Christian Schneirla (1902–1968), American animal psychologist
 Frederick Smith (1805–1879), worked in the zoology department of the British Museum from 1849, specialising in the Hymenoptera
 Roy R. Snelling (1934–2008), American entomologist credited with many important finds of rare or new ant species
 Erich Wasmann (1859–1931), Austrian entomologist
 Neal Albert Weber (1908–2001), American myrmecologist
 John Obadiah Westwood (1805–1893), English entomologist and archaeologist also noted for his artistic talents
 William Morton Wheeler (1865–1937), curator of invertebrate zoology in the American Museum of Natural History, described many new species
Edward Osborne Wilson (1929–2021), Pulitzer Prize winning American myrmecologist, revolutionized the field of sociobiology

Contemporary myrmecologists 
 Donat Agosti, Swiss entomologist
 Cesare Baroni Urbani, Swiss ant taxonomist
 Barry Bolton, English ant taxonomist
 Alfred Buschinger, German myrmecologist
 Henri Cagniant, French myrmecologist
 John S. Clark, Scottish myrmecologist
 Cedric Alex Collingwood, British entomologist
 Mark Amidon Deyrup, American myrmecologist
 Francesc Xavier Espadaler i Gelabert, Spanish myrmecologist, specialist in Mediterranean and Macaronesian ants and in invasive species 
 Deborah Gordon (1955–), studies ant colony behavior and ecology
 William H. Gotwald Jr., American entomologist
 Michael J. Greene studies interactions between chemical cues and behavior patterns
 Bert Hölldobler (1936–), Pulitzer Prize winning German myrmecologist
 Laurent Keller (1961–), Swiss evolutionary biologist and myrmecologist
 John E. Lattke
 John T. Longino, American entomologist
 Mark W. Moffett (1958–), American entomologist and photographer
 Corrie S. Moreau, American evolutionary biologist and entomologist, wrote on evolution and diversification of ants
 Justin Orvel Schmidt, American entomologist, studies the chemical and behavioral defenses of ants, wasps, and arachnids
 Bernhard Seifert, German entomologist
 Steven O. Shattuck, American-Australian entomologist
 Marion R. Smith, American entomologist
 Robert W. Taylor, Australian myrmecologist
 Alberto Tinaut Ranera, Spanish myrmecologist
 Walter R. Tschinkel, American myrmecologist
Laurel D. Hansen, (1940–) American myrmecologist, studies carpenter ant biology and urban management
 James C. Trager, American myrmecologist
 Gary J. Umphrey, American biostatistician and myrmecologist
 Philip S. Ward, American entomologist
 Daniel Kronauer American myrmecologist
 Alejandro G. Farji-Brener, Argentinean myrmecologist
 Susanne Foitzik, German myrmecologist

Related terms
Myrmecochorous (adj.) dispersed by ants
Myrmecophagous (adj.) feeding on ants
Myrmecophile (n.) an organism that habitually shares an ant nest, myrmecophilous (adj.), myrmecophily (n.)
Myrmidons (n.) ant-men in Metamorphoses and in Homer's Iliad, where they are Achilles' warriors

See also
Ant-keeping
Bees, Wasps and Ants Recording Society
Formicarium, also known as ant farm
Stigmergy, a biological mechanism attributed to the coordination of ants and other social insects
Myrmecological News, an independent, international, non-profit, scientific journal devoted to ant research
International Union for the Study of Social Insects
Ant colony optimization
Swarm intelligence

References

External links

Documentary about myrmecology 

 
Subfields of entomology